Marino Klinger Salazar (7 February 1936 – 19 May 1975) was a Colombian footballer who played as a forward. He was a member of the Colombia national team at the 1962 FIFA World Cup which was held in Chile.

Career
Born in Buenaventura, Valle del Cauca, Klinger played club football for amateur side Oro del Puerto and local Buenaventura and Valle del Cauca department selections. He played professionally for Millonarios, where he won the Colombian league five times. He also played for Santa Fe.

Personal
Klinger died in an automobile accident in Cali in 1975.

References

1936 births
1975 deaths
Colombian footballers
Association football forwards
Colombia international footballers
1962 FIFA World Cup players
Categoría Primera A players
Millonarios F.C. players
Independiente Santa Fe footballers
Road incident deaths in Colombia
Colombian people of German descent
People from Buenaventura, Valle del Cauca
Sportspeople from Valle del Cauca Department
20th-century Colombian people